Donald Milford Payne (July 16, 1934 – March 6, 2012) was an American politician who was the U.S. representative for  from 1989 until his death. He was a member of the Democratic Party. The district encompassed most of the city of Newark, parts of Jersey City and Elizabeth, and some suburban communities in Essex and Union counties. He was the first African American to represent New Jersey in Congress.

Early life, education, and early political career
Payne was born in Newark and was a 1952 graduate of Barringer High School. He did his undergraduate studies at Seton Hall University, graduating in 1957. After graduating he pursued post-graduate studies in Springfield College in Massachusetts. Before being elected to Congress in 1988, Payne was an executive at Prudential Financial, Vice President of Urban Data Systems Inc., and  a teacher in the Newark Public Schools. In 1970, Payne became the first black president of the National Council of YMCAs. From 1973 to 1981 he was Chairman of the World Y.M.C.A. Refugee and Rehabilitation Committee.

Payne's political career began in 1972, when he was elected to the Essex County Board of Chosen Freeholders, serving three terms.

In 1978, Payne ran against, and came in third to, Peter Shapiro in the June primary selecting the Democratic candidate for the first Essex County Executive, with Sheriff John F. Cryan coming in second.

In 1982, he was elected to the Newark Municipal Council and served three terms, resigning in 1988 shortly after his election to Congress.

U.S. House of Representatives

Elections
Payne ran against U.S. Congressman Peter Rodino in the 1980 and 1986 Democratic primaries but lost both times. Rodino retired in 1988 after 40 years in Congress.  Payne defeated fellow Municipal Councilman Ralph T. Grant Jr. in the Democratic primary, the real contest in this heavily Democratic, black-majority district. He was re-elected eleven  times with no substantive opposition, never dropping below 75% of the vote.

1996 Results  
 Don Payne (D) 84.16%  
 Vanessa Williams (R) 14.62%  
 Harley Tyler (NL) 0.79%  
 Toni Jackson (SWP) 0.43%

1998 Results  
 Don Payne (D) 84%  
 William Wnuck (R) 11%

2000 Results
 Donald M. Payne (D) 87.5% 
 Dirk B. Weber (R) 12.1%
 Maurice Williams (I) 0.4%

In the 2002 general election, Payne was reelected with 84.5% of the vote, receiving a higher margin of the vote than in any other New Jersey Congressional race run that year. In 2004, the Republicans didn't even put up a candidate, and Payne was reelected with 97% of the vote, against Green Party candidate  Toy-Ling Washington and Socialist Workers Party candidate Sara J. Lobman.  In 2006, Payne was unopposed in the primary and general elections. In 2008, he won 99% of the vote against Green candidate Michael Taber. In 2010, Payne defeated little-known candidate Micheal Alonso.

U.S. House of Representatives

General elections

Primary elections

Tenure

Payne's voting record was considered to have been the most consistently progressive of all New Jersey Congressmen at the time of his death. He was pro-choice and against the death penalty. He was a member, and former chair, of the Congressional Black Caucus and was chosen in 2002 by House Minority Leader Nancy Pelosi to serve on the Democratic Steering Committee. The Democratic Steering Committee chooses which House Committees each individual Democratic Congressmen will serve on and also plays a crucial part in shaping the Democratic legislative agenda. In international issues, Payne was active on issues relating to Africa, particularly regarding the conflict in the Darfur region of Sudan and the Western Sahara conflict.

As a leading advocate of education, Payne was instrumental in the passage of key legislation, including the Goals 2000 initiative to improve elementary and secondary schools; the School-to-Work Opportunities Act; the National Service Act, establishment of the National Literacy Institute; and funding for Head Start, Pell Grants, Summer Jobs and Student Loans.

Payne was also a member of the U.S. House Committee on Foreign Affairs, where he served as Chairman of the United States House Foreign Affairs Subcommittee on Africa and Global Health and as a member of the Subcommittee on the United States House Foreign Affairs Subcommittee on the Western Hemisphere and the United States House Foreign Affairs Subcommittee on International Organizations, Human Rights, and Oversight. Congressman Payne was at the forefront of efforts to restore democracy and human rights in nations throughout the globe. He was one of five members of Congress chosen to accompany President Bill Clinton and Hillary Clinton on their historic six-nation tour of Africa. He also headed a Presidential mission to war-torn Rwanda  to help find solutions to that country's political and humanitarian crises. In addition, he was recognized as having the most supportive record in Congress on issues involving the Northern Ireland peace process.

On June 22, 2001 Payne was arrested after protesting against the Sudanese government at its embassy in Washington, D.C. He was a supporter of and endorsed the Genocide Intervention Network.

In 2003, President George W. Bush appointed Payne as one of two members of Congress to serve as a Congressional delegate to the United Nations and reappointed him in 2005 to an unprecedented second term. In this role, he met with the U.N. Secretary General, the U.S. Ambassador to the U.N. and regularly attended sessions of the U.N. General Assembly and other high level meetings.

He was one of the 31 House Democrats who voted to not count the 20 electoral votes from Ohio in the 2004 presidential election. President George W. Bush won Ohio by 118,457 votes. Without Ohio's electoral votes, the election would have been decided by the U.S. House of Representatives, with each state having one vote in accordance with the Twelfth Amendment to the United States Constitution.

Payne received an "A" on the liberal Drum Major Institute's 2005 Congressional Scorecard on middle-class issues.

Payne served on the board of directors of the National Endowment for Democracy, TransAfrica, Discovery Channel Global Education Fund, the Congressional Award Foundation, the Boys and Girls Clubs of Newark, the Newark Day Center, the Fighting Back Initiative and the Newark YMCA. He received numerous awards and honors from national, international and community-based organizations, including the Visionaries Award bestowed by the Africa Society and the prestigious Democracy Service Medal, which was previously awarded to Lech Walesa, the former Polish President and founder of the Solidarity movement, by the National Endowment for Democracy.

Payne supported Senator Barack Obama in his bid for the Democratic presidential nomination after originally supporting Hillary Clinton.

Attack in Somalia
On April 13, 2009, Payne's plane was departing from Mogadishu, Somalia, when Somali fighters fired mortars at the airport.  Payne was unhurt, as his plane was already bound for Kenya.  The attack came just one day after Captain Richard Phillips was rescued from Somali pirates after their failed hijacking of the MV Maersk Alabama.  Payne stated that his party on the plane did not know the airport was attacked until after they arrived in Kenya

Committee assignments
Committee on Education and the Workforce
Subcommittee on Early Childhood, Elementary and Secondary Education
Subcommittee on Workforce Protections
Committee on Foreign Affairs
Subcommittee on Africa and Global Health
Subcommittee on the Western Hemisphere

Caucus memberships
Congressional Black Caucus
Congressional Human Rights Caucus
International Conservation Caucus
Silk Road Congressional Caucus
Congressional Arts Caucus

Personal life
Several other of Payne's family members have held or currently hold public office. His son, Donald M. Payne Jr., was president of the Municipal Council of Newark and an Essex County Freeholder-At-Large, and was elected to fill his father's seat in Congress on November 6, 2012. His brother, William D. Payne, served in the New Jersey General Assembly from 1998 to 2008. His nephew, Craig A. Stanley, served in the General Assembly from 1996 to 2008.

Death
Payne announced in a statement on February 10, 2012 that he was undergoing treatment for colon cancer. On March 2, 2012, it was reported that Payne had been flown from a hospital in Washington D.C. back to New Jersey via a medical transport plane, because he was "gravely ill". Payne died four days later, aged 77.

Payne was succeeded in Congress by his son, Donald Payne Jr.

See also
List of African-American United States representatives

References

External links
Congressman Donald M. Payne official U.S. House website
 

Profile at SourceWatch
Milestones In the History of African Americans and the YMCA

|-

1934 births
2012 deaths
20th-century American politicians
21st-century American politicians
African-American members of the United States House of Representatives
African-American schoolteachers
Baptists from New Jersey
Barringer High School alumni
Candidates in the 1980 United States elections
Candidates in the 1986 United States elections
County commissioners in New Jersey
Deaths from cancer in New Jersey
Democratic Party members of the United States House of Representatives from New Jersey
Deaths from colorectal cancer
Members of the Municipal Council of Newark
African-American city council members in New Jersey
Prudential Financial people
Seton Hall University alumni
Springfield College (Massachusetts) alumni
Schoolteachers from New Jersey
YMCA leaders
20th-century Baptists
20th-century African-American politicians
21st-century African-American politicians